Graft (stylised as GRAFT) is a design studio conceived as a ‘label’ for architecture, urban planning, exhibition design, music and the “pursuit of happiness”. Graft was founded in 1998 in Los Angeles, California by Lars Krückeberg, Wolfram Putz and Thomas Willemeit, and headed by partner Alejandra Lillo from 2007  until early 2011.  A second Graft office was opened 2001 in Berlin, followed by a third office in Beijing in 2004, which is headed by founding partner Gregor Hoheisel.

Company history and statement of intent
The name GRAFT was derived from the terminology of botany, the grafting of one shoot onto another genetically different host. The practice believed that the traditional boundaries of architecture needed to be questioned, as it continually changes when it engages with global and local environments.

Selected Projects

Current
MIR NOLA Shotgun, New Orleans, Louisiana United States
Qinhuangdao Hotel & Residences, China

Recently Completed 
2010 KU 64 Children's Dental Clinic, Berlin, Germany 
2010 Dalian Daily Towers, Dalian, China
2010 Sichuan Airlines VIP Lobby, Beijing, China
2010 Studio Simmen, Berlin, Germany 
2009 AO Project, Tokyo, Japan
2009 Boulevard of the Stars, Berlin, Germany
2009 MIR NOLA Camelback, New Orleans, Louisiana United States
2009 W New York Downtown Hotel and Residences, New York City, New York United States 
2009 Poolscape Restaurant and Bars, City Center, Las Vegas, Nevada United States 
2009 Residential Commune, Tbilisi, Georgia                                   
2009 Hotel Iveria Tbilisi, Georgia 
2009 Lakeside Villa, Berlin, Germany 
2009 Platoon Kunsthall, Seoul, South Korea  
2009 Loft Kullman, Hamburg, Germany 
2009 Kanera 1D, 1E, 1H, 1X
2008 KU 64 Dental Clinic, Berlin, Germany 
2008 Sakanela Urban Development, Tbilisi, Georgia
2008 The Pink Project, New Orleans, Louisiana United States
2008 Gongti F+B Club, Beijing, China
2008 Ao-Di Next Gene 20 Villa, Taiwan 
2008 Tsinandali Winery & Hotel, Georgia
2008 Bird Island Villas, Kuala Lumpur, Malaysia
2008 Hausvogteiplatz, Berlin, Germany
2008 Gongti Hotel, Beijing, China
2008 Panorama Tower 3, Las Vegas, Nevada United States 
2008 Germany Unity Flag, nomadic
2008 Kinderdentist Dr. med. dent. Mokabberi, Berlin, Germany 
2008 Gingko Bacchus Restaurant, Chengdou, China
2008 The Emperor Hotel, Beijing, China 
2008 Brand, Monte Carlo Resort and Casino, Las Vegas, Nevada United States
2008 DC Melrose Store, Los Angeles, California United States
2008 Dental Lounge, Düsseldorf, Germany
2007 Panorama Towers 1+2, Las Vegas, Nevada United States 
2007 Opticon Flagship Store, Hamburg, Germany
2007 Eric Paris Salon, Beijing, China
2006 Riga Treehouses, Vecaki, Latvia

Awards and prizes

2013
 Design Award of the Association of German Architects (BDA), awarded for GRAFT's KU 64 Children's Dental Clinic

2011
 European Prize for Architecture, awarded for GRAFT's Pink Project and humanitarian concerns

2010
Contract Magazine's 2010 Designers of the Year

2009
Boulevard der Stars competition, 1st place
Columbiaquartier competition, 2nd place
Kanera 1D, Steel Innovation Prize
The Pink Project, Gold, Design Award of the Federal Republic of Germany
Thermopal Designers Collection, Red Dot Design Award
Thermopal Designers Collection, nominee, Design Award of the Federal Republic of Germany
2009 American Architecture Awards, Make It Right Shotgun House
AR-Architectural Review Awards, Make It Right Shotgun House
International Architecture Award, Kinderdentist
Good Design, Kanera 1D
INDEX: Design 2009 Award, finalist, Pink Project
AIA Restaurant Design Awards, finalist, Gingko Restaurant
Illumination Awards, Award of Merit, Gingko Bacchus Restaurant
Gingko Bacchus, finalist, AIA Restaurant Design Awards
Gingko Bacchus, Award of Merit, Illumination Awards

2008
Archip, Public Interior/Innovation, highest award for the Interior Design of KU64
Bird Island competition, finalist 
The Emperor Hotel, finalist, Best of Year, Hospitality/Hotel/International, Interior Design Awards 
The Emperor Hotel, finalist, Best Hotel Design and Best Guest Room, Gold Key Awards
Eric Paris Salon, honorable mention, Best New Retail Store,  or more, SADI Award
Graftworld, finalist, Innovation, 6th Saint-Gobain Gypsum International Trophy
Kanera 1E, Red Dot Design Award
Kanera 1E, nominee, Design Award of the Federal Republic of Germany
Kinderdentist,  Best of Year finalist, Healthcare, Interior Design Awards 
Opticon, Grand SADI Award 
The Pink Project, Yellow Pencil, Environmental Design/Installations, D&AD Awards 
The Pink Project, Exhibit, Best of Year, Interior Design Awards 
The Pink Project, shortlist, Gute Gestaltung, Deutscher Designer Club 
The Pink Project, selected for German Pavilion, XI Venice Biennale of Architecture
Studio Jeanot Simmen competition, 1st place

2007
Dalian Daily competition, 1st prize 
Eric Paris Salon, finalist, Best of Year, Interior Design Awards 
Graftworld, 1st Place, Innovation, The Rigips Trophy
Hotel Q, Bar Design of the Year, Mixology Awards
Mercedes Benz&Maybach Trade Fair Booth, finalist, Design Award of the Federal Republic of Germany
Samana Luxury Resort, Best Unbuilt Project, Hospitality Design Awards
Sci-Fi, Gold Medal, 20th Annual Exhibit Design Award

2006
nominee, Iakov Chernikov International Prize for Young Architects
HEWI Modular Wall, finalist, Best of Year, Interior Design Awards 
Hotel Q, True Stylish Hotel award, World Hotel Award 
Mercedes Benz & Maybach Trade Fair Booth AMI 2006, Award der ausgezeichneten Messeauftritte, Category XL, ADAM Silber Award
Moonraker, finalist, Best of Year, Interior Design Awards 
Sci-Fi, Gold Medal, 20th Annual Exhibit Design Award 
STACK, Best Dramatic Space, Boutique Design Award 
STACK, finalist, Gold Key Award 
STACK, People's Choice Award (and finalist), Restaurant Design Award, AIA LA 
STACK, finalist, Fine Dining, Hospitality Design Restaurant Award 
STACK, shortlist, Hotel/Restaurant, contractworld Award 
STACK, Best New Restaurant, Las Vegas Weekly Readers' Choice Awards

2005
FIX, finalist, Restaurant Design Award, AIA LA 
Hotel Q, Hospitality Design Award
Hotel Q, Travel and Leisure Award	
Hotel Q, Best of Category, Floor Coverings, contractworld Award 
Hotel Q, ArTravel Award
Panorama Towers, Unbuilt Category, AIA NV Design Awards 
Wave of the Future Award

2004
Hotel Q, Auszeichnung, Hans Schaefers Preis
Hotel Q, Honor Award, AIA LA
Neue Sentimental Film Headquarters, 2nd Prize, contractworld Award
Panorama Towers, Unbuilt Category, AIA NV Design Awards

2003
Zeal Pictures Office, 2nd Prize, Best Office, Femb Award  
Zeal Pictures Office, European Design Awards

Exhibitions
Graftworld- Scenographic Architecture at AEDES, Berlin January–February 2007
After the Flood: Building on Higher Ground at A+D Museum: Los Angeles April–July 2008. Featuring Make it Right and Pink Project

Publications
Architecture in Times of Need,  Kristin Feireiss, Publisher Prestel, 2009 
Hatch: the New Architectural Generation,Kieran Long, Laurence King Publishers, 2008,  
Graftworld Aedes Exhibition, Published by Aedes,

External links
 GRAFT official website
 Interview with GRAFT

References

Restaurant design